Always in My Heart is a 1942 American drama film directed by Jo Graham and starring Kay Francis and Walter Huston. The song "Siempre en Mi Corazón" ("Always in My Heart"), by Ernesto Lecuona (music and Spanish lyrics) and Kim Gannon (English lyrics) was nominated for an Oscar for Best Original Song.

Plot summary
MacKenzie Scott (Walter Huston), a brilliant musician, is falsely convicted of murder and sentenced to life. While Scott languishes in prison, his long-suffering ex-wife Marjorie (Kay Francis) raises their two children to adulthood. Out of respect for Scott, whom she still loves, Marjorie never reveals to the kids that their father is in jail, insisting instead that Scott has long since died.

Cast
 Kay Francis as Marjorie 'Mudge' Scott  
 Walter Huston as MacKenzie 'Mac' Scott  
 Gloria Warren as Victoria 'Vickie' Scott  
 Diana Hale as Booley, Angie's Granddaughter (credited as Patty Hale)  
 Frankie Thomas as Martin 'Marty' Scott  
 Una O'Connor as Angie, Scotts' Housekeeper  
 Sidney Blackmer as Philip Ames  
 Armida as Lolita  
 Frank Puglia as Joe Borelli  
 Russell Arms as Red  
 Anthony Caruso as Frank  
 Elvira Curci as Rosita Borelli  
 John Hamilton as Warden  
 Harry Lewis as Steve  
 Herbert Gunn as Dick
 Borrah Minevitch as Blackie
 The Harmonica Rascals as Themselves

Box office
The film earned $524,000 in the US and Canada and $1,574,000 elsewhere.

References

External links 
 
 
 
 

1942 films
1942 drama films
American black-and-white films
American drama films
1940s English-language films
American films based on plays
Films set in California
Warner Bros. films
Films scored by Heinz Roemheld
Films directed by Jo Graham
1940s American films